The African Regional Intellectual Property Organization (ARIPO), formerly African Regional Industrial Property Organization, is an intergovernmental organization for cooperation among African states in patent and other intellectual property matters. ARIPO was established by the Lusaka Agreement of 1976. It has the capacity to hear applications for patents and registered trademarks in its member states who are parties to the Harare (patents), Banjul (marks) and Arusha (plant varieties) protocols. ARIPO also features a protocol on the protection of traditional knowledge, the Swakopmund Protocol, signed in 2010 by 9 member states of the organization which entered into force on May 11, 2015, and was amended on December 6, 2016.

ARIPO has the WIPO ST.3 code AP. Its 19 member states are mostly English-speaking countries. Rwanda became the 18th member state on March 24, 2010, and São Tomé and Príncipe on May 19, 2014 (the Harare Protocol entered into force on August 19, 2014 with respect to São Tomé and Príncipe). Seychelles became a member State of ARIPO on 1 January 2022.

The name of the organization changed from African Regional Industrial Property Organization to African Regional Intellectual Property Organization in 2005.

History

Lusaka Agreement 
At a patents and copyright seminar for English-speaking African countries organised in October 1972 by the World Intellectual Property Organisation (WIPO), the country representatives endorsed a plan to have WIPO and the United Nations Economic Commission for Africa (UNECA) organise a conference to discuss the harmonisation of industrial property legislation and the creation of a central office. The conference, to which 19 English-speaking countries were invited, took place in Addis Ababa, Ethiopia, from 4 to 10 June 1974. During the conference, a draft agreement toward the establishment of an organisation on industrial property for the English-speaking African countries was prepared and several resolutions were passed to facilitate that goal; it was also agreed to eventually hold a diplomatic conference to adopt the draft. 

The diplomatic conference to adopt the agreement was subsequently convened by WIPO and UNECA in Lusaka, Zambia, from 6 to 9 December 1976. 13 English-speaking African countries sent delegates. The "Agreement on the Creation of the Industrial Property Organization for English-speaking Africa" (Lusaka Agreement) was adopted on 9 December 1976 with Ghana, Kenya, Mauritius, Somalia, Uganda, and Zambia as original signatories. It entered into force on 15 February 1978. The general purpose of the new regional organisation, known at the time as ESARIPO, was to achieve a higher degree of cooperation in the area of industrial property; this included efforts to work toward the harmonisation and joint development of national industrial property laws. The organisation was originally based in Nairobi, Kenya, until it was decided in 1981 to move the headquarters to Harare, Zimbabwe. 

Under the Lusaka Agreement, membership to ESARIPO was originally open to English-speaking African countries (Lusaka Agreement, art IV). The Agreement also provided that the organisation maintain a close working relationship with WIPO and UNECA (art V) and cooperate with other appropriate organisations (art VI) such as OAPI. Early on, ESARIPO was especially focused on harmonisation efforts in the area of patent law. At the Diplomatic Conference in Lusaka, the members requested that until the organisation has established its own secretariat, WIPO and UNECA should "take the necessary preparatory steps for the implementation of the project to establish a patent documentation center in the framework of a regional Office". This process culminated in the adoption of the Harare Protocol on patents on designs in 1982.

Members

(Tanzania does not include Zanzibar, which operates under its own, independent intellectual property regime and maintains a separate office for the registration of intellectual property.)

, five countries have signed the Arusha Protocol of 6 July 2015 (Gambia, Ghana, Mozambique, São Tomé and Príncipe, and Tanzania). , two countries have ratified or acceded to it (Rwanda and São Tomé and Príncipe). For the Protocol to enter into force, four countries need to have deposited their instruments of ratification or accession.

Seychelles became a member State of ARIPO on 1 January 2022.

Observers

Organs
ARIPO’s organisational structure consists of four organs: the Council of Ministers, the Administrative Council, the Secretariat, and the Board of Appeal.

Rights covered

Together, the two protocols constituting the organisation cover copyright, industrial design, patent, trademark, traditional knowledge and utility model rights.

International cooperation
 On 3 October 2019, the ARIPO signed a Memorandum of Understanding with the Eurasian Patent Organization.

See also
 Organisation Africaine de la Propriété Intellectuelle (OAPI)

References

External links
 Official website

Intellectual property organizations
Patent offices
Organizations based in Africa